My Fragile Heart is a two-part British television crime drama miniseries, written by Abi Morgan, that first broadcast on ITV on 17 September 2000. The series starred Sarah Lancashire as Trina Lavery, a young woman who returns to her childhood home to look after her terminally ill mother, only to find the man accused of the murder of her best friend several years ago living nearby. The series was directed by Gavin Millar, with Rebecca De Souza acting as producer.

The first episode gathered 9.82 million viewers. Episode two dipped slightly; gathering 9.58 million. The series was sold abroad, with both episodes combined into a single film, running at 146 minutes (minus adverts). The series was later released on VHS, exclusively via WHSmith stores. This remains the only home video release to date.

Plot
Trina Lavery (Sarah Lancashire) returns to her hometown of Stoke-on-Trent after 20 years, there to look after her ailing mother. Upon her arrival, Trina discovers that Bernard Cleve (Lorcan Cranitch), the man who was arrested for the murder of her best friend some years ago, is also living in Stoke, his case having been tossed out of court. Though a free man in the eyes of the law, Bernard is unable to escape suspicion when another local girl is killed. This time around, however, Trina has a feeling that Bernard was not responsible – and in setting out to prove her theory, she risks becoming victim number three.

Reception
The Guardian said of the first episode; "Adultery on a bed of sofa cushions, burgeoning teenage sexuality in the woods and a shortage of ice in the home of Trina's alcoholic mum (she took to using frozen peas instead), these are not recognisable traits of cosy Sunday night television. All of which made My Fragile Heart both topical and, more importantly, excellent drama."

Cast

 Sarah Lancashire as Trina Lavery
 Lorcan Cranitch as Bernard Cleve
 John McArdle as Roy Lavery
 Anne Stallybrass as Sandra Park
 Lynda Rooke as Maureen 'Mo' Blake
 Robert Glenister as Stephen 'Squeal' Blake
 Sarah Price as Becca Blake
 Eva Pope as Ruby Mason
 Kate Richards	as Katya Mason
 James Peachey as Andrew Mason
 Caroline Strong as Claire Macavoy
 Nicholas Gleaves as Joe Macavoy
 Kelly Thresher as Shannon Macavoy
 Sue Norville as Aileen Murray
 David Westhead as DCI Peter Murray
 Paul Young as DCI Owen Simmons
 James Higginson as DI Richard Marks
 Roger Brierley as Michael Dillon
 Geoff Holman as Freddie Gibbs

References

External links

2000 films
2000 British television series debuts
2000 British television series endings
2000s British drama television series
2000s British television miniseries
English-language television shows
British thriller television series
ITV television dramas
Television series by Tiger Aspect Productions
Television series by Endemol
Television shows set in Staffordshire
Films directed by Gavin Millar